State Bank Building is a building in Rostov-on-Don, Russia. It was constructed in 1915 and designed by architect M. M. Peretyatkovich. Initially, the office of the State Bank of the Russian Empire was situated in the building. Nowadays it is home to the Rostov affiliate of the Central Bank of Russia. It has the status of an object of cultural heritage of regional significance.

At the beginning of the 20th century, the office of the State Bank was located in a two-story building on the corner of Bolshaya Sadovaya Street and Sredny Prospekt (now Sokolova Avenue). There was not enough room for it, so they had to rent some additional premises. Then it was decided to build a new building instead of the old one.

The new building was designed by architect M. M. Peretyatkovich in 1910. Initially, the process of calculations and the preparation of working drawings was led by the architect S.V. Popilin, but he was soon pushed aside because of his tardiness. Peretyatkovich chose a Rostov civil engineer, P.A. Tarachkov, as an assistant. A.P. Butkov was a technical consultant.

In September 1912 Peretyatkovich came to Rostov-on-Don for general management of the construction. By that time the old building of the bank had already been demolished. The construction was supposed to be started in late autumn, but due to the frosts, the work was rescheduled for the next spring. Construction began on April 28, 1913. Construction of the State Bank's office was completed in 1915. The building of the State Bank front faced tNew Market Square (now Soviets Square) and was turned into the sanctuary of the Alexander Nevsky Cathedral (demolished in 1930).

After the establishment of the Soviet Union, the building was nationalized. In the 1920s, according to Peretyatkovich's plans, the south-eastern part was completed, where private apartments of employees were located. The building of the State Bank was the only building on the square to survive the Great Patriotic War. During the reconstruction of the square, the fronts of other buildings were designed in a similar neoclassical style.

In the 1950s, instead of a sculptural composition with a double-headed eagle, the coat of arms of the USSR was installed on the facade of the building . In 1994, the facade was reconstructed, during which the original heraldic composition was restored.

References

Tourist attractions in Rostov-on-Don
Buildings and structures in Rostov-on-Don
Cultural heritage monuments in Rostov-on-Don
Cultural heritage monuments of federal significance in Rostov Oblast